Peter IV served as Greek Patriarch of Alexandria from 642 to 651. Following the Muslim conquest of Egypt, he sought refuge in Constantinople.

References

Coptic Orthodox saints
7th-century Patriarchs of Alexandria
7th-century Christian saints